Wear It's 'At is the debut album by English pop band The Rubettes assembled in 1973 by the songwriting team of Wayne Bickerton, then the head of A&R at Polydor Records, and his co-songwriter, Tony Waddington, after their doo-wop and 1950s American pop-influenced songs had been rejected by a number of existing acts. Tracks from this album also exhibited the doo-wop style. The album title was a reference to the group's wearing trademark white suits and white cloth caps on stage, a white cap being shown on the album front cover.

The album reached No. 32 in the German charts and No. 42 in the Netherlands on its release in 1974. A track from the album, "Sugar Baby Love" was an instant singles hit remaining at number one in the United Kingdom for four weeks in May 1974, while reaching No. 37 on the US chart that August, and remains their best-known record.

In 1992, Dice Records (France) released the Rubettes' first two albums (Wear It's 'At and We Can Do It) as a double CD set. In 2010 Cherry Red Records issued the album Wear It's 'At on CD with two bonus tracks. In 2015, Caroline Records released the album Wear It's 'At, with the same two bonus tracks, as part of a box CD set of the Rubettes' first five studio albums.

Track listing
Side 1
"Way Back in the Fifties" (Wayne Bickerton, Tony Waddington) – 3:37
"Rock is Dead" (Wayne Bickerton, Tony Waddington) – 3:09
"Tonight" (Wayne Bickerton, Tony Waddington) – 3:42
"The Way of Love" (John Richardson, Alan Williams) – 3:19
"Rumours" (John Richardson, Alan Williams) – 2:30
"Your Love" (Pete Arnesen) – 5:27

Side 2
"For Ever" (John Richardson, Alan Williams) – 3:59
"Sugar Baby Love" (Wayne Bickerton, Tony Waddington) – 3:31
"Teenage Dream" (Jon Richardson, Alan Williams) – 3:01
"Rock and Roll Survival" (John Richardson, Alan Williams) – 3:22
"When You’re Sixteen" (Wayne Bickerton, Tony Waddington) – 2:46
"Saturday Night" (Wayne Bickerton, Tony Waddington) – 2:18

2010 and 2015 CD bonus tracks
13.  "You Could Have Told Me" (Waddington, Bickerton) – 2:48
14.  "Silent Movie Queen" (Williams, Richardson) – 3:46

 NB: All track times taken from CD track list

Charts

Singles
1.  "Sugar Baby Love" b/w "You Could Have Told Me" – January 1974 – UK No. 1, US Billboard  Hot 100 No. 37, US Cashbox No. 30
2.  "Tonight" b/w "Silent Movie Queen" – July 1974 – UK No. 12

Personnel
Alan Williams – vocals, guitar
John Richardson – drums, vocals
Mick Clarke – bass, vocals
Tony Thorpe – lead guitar, vocals
Pete Arnesen – piano
Bill Hurd – piano, vocals

Of the original Rubettes line-up only Richardson, Williams and Arnesen participated in the recording of "Sugar Baby Love" although all members featured on the Top of the Pops re-recording for playback purposes.

Publishers (including bonus tracks)
Tracks 1, 3, 10, 12, 13 & 14 – Pamscene Ltd/Sony-ATV Music
Tracks 2, 7, 8 & 11 – Warner Brothers Music/Warner Chappell/Arlovol Music
Tracks 4, 5 & 9 – Sony-ATV Music
Track 6 – Copyright Control

Production and credits
Producer: Wayne Bickerton
Recorded at: Morgan Studios & Lansdowne Studios
String arrangements: John Cameron ("Tonight"), Arthur Greenslade ("Your Love" & "When You're Sixteen") and Gerry Shury ("Sugar Baby Love").
Engineer: John Mackswith
Album photography: Mike Putland and Mike Leale

References

1974 debut albums
The Rubettes albums
Polydor Records albums
Albums arranged by John Cameron (musician)
Albums arranged by Arthur Greenslade
Albums recorded at Morgan Sound Studios